Gregor Hagedorn (born 1965) is a German botanist and academic director at the Natural History Museum, Berlin.

Life 

Gregor Hagedorn studied biology at the University of Tübingen and at Duke University (North Carolina). Afterwards, he worked in the Department of Mycology at the University of Bayreuth until 2007. In 2007 his dissertation on "Structuring Descriptive Data of Organisms – Requirement Analysis and Information Models" was completed at the University of Bayreuth.

From 1992 to 2013 he was a staff member at the Federal Biological Research Centre for Agriculture and Forestry, now Julius Kühn Institute. He played a major role in the development of a data standard for describing gender within the Taxonomic Databases Working Group.

Since 2013, Hagedorn has been working at the Museum of Natural History Berlin, first as Head of Digital World and Information Science (until 2016), then as Academic Director.

Between 2014 and 2018 Hagedorn was a member of the German National Council for Information Infrastructures as a representative of the scientific organisations.

Scientists for Future 

Together with other scientists, Hagedorn founded the grassroots movement Scientists for Future (S4F) in March 2019.  This initiative was inspired by a group of Belgian scientists who had earlier offered their support to the nascent Fridays for Future movement in January 2019 under the banner of Scientists for Climate.  The first statement by Scientists For Future was written by a circle of 30people and signed by  scientists in Germany, Switzerland, and Austria.  The key authors also published a similar statement in Science with scientists from the United States, including Michael Mann and Katharine Hayhoe.  Hagedorn represented Scientists for Future at an environmental meeting with the German Federal President Frank-Walter Steinmeier in early 2020.  In late2021, Hagedorn presented a TEDx talk in Potsdam on the topic of sustainability.

Awards 

 2016: Badge of Honour by the German Phytomedical Society for his commitment to create a phytomedical wiki for phytomedical terms and definitions
 2019: Best Paper Award from GAIA Verlag for the publication The concerns of the young protesters are justified. A statement by Scientists for Future
 2019: Federal Sustainability Prize in the Politics category of the German Sustainability Association for Hagedorn and the Scientists For Future

Bibliography

References

External links 

 Academic homepage

1965 births
Living people
20th-century German botanists
People from Gelsenkirchen
21st-century German botanists